The 2017–18 season was Coventry City's 134th season in their existence and their first in the English fourth tier for 59 years, League Two, following relegation the previous season. Along with competing in League Two, the club participated in three cup competitions: FA Cup, EFL Cup and EFL Trophy.

The season covers the period between 1 July 2017 and 30 June 2018.

Coventry's 6th place league finish, despite being the lowest in their history, was their highest in any division since the 1969–70 season.

Review and events

July
Nathan Clarke, Kevin Foley, Andy Rose, Rúben Lameiras, Vladimir Gadzhev, Jack Finch, Kyle Spence, Marcus Tudgay and Jacob Whitmore are all released following the end of their contracts.

Competitions

Preseason friendlies
As of 27 June 2017, Coventry City have announced seven pre-season friendlies against Liverpool XI, Nuneaton Town, Sutton United, Barnsley, Mickleover Sports, Milton Keynes Dons, Valenciennes and Leamington.

League Two

League table

Results summary

Results by matchday

Matches
On 21 June 2017, the league fixtures were announced.

Football League play-offs

FA Cup

On 16 October 2017, Coventry City were drawn at home to Maidenhead United in the first round. Another home tie for the second round was confirmed with Boreham Wood the visiting side. A third home tie was drawn for the third round, with Premier League side Stoke City the visitors.

Maxime Biamou scored the only goal of the game as Coventry beat Milton Keynes Dons away in the fourth round. Coventry took 7,833 supporters to the game, outnumbering the home fans.

EFL Cup

On 16 June 2017, Coventry City were drawn at home to Blackburn Rovers in the first round.

EFL Trophy

On 12 July 2017, Coventry City were drawn in Northern Group E against Shrewsbury Town, Walsall and West Bromwich Albion Academy.

Squad information

Squad details

* Player age and appearances/goals for the club as of beginning of 2017–18 season.

Appearances
Correct as of match played on 28 May 2018

Goalscorers
Correct as of match played on 28 May 2018

Assists
Correct as of match played on 28 May 2018

Yellow cards
Correct as of match played on 28 May 2018

Red cards
Correct as of match played on 28 May 2018

Captains
Correct as of match played on 28 May 2018

Suspensions served

Hat-tricks

Monthly & weekly awards

End-of-season awards

International appearances

Transfers

Transfers in

Transfers out

Loans in

Loans out

Trials

References

External links
 Official Site: 2017-18
 BBC Sport – Club Stats
 Soccerbase – Results | Squad Stats | Transfers

Coventry City
Coventry City F.C. seasons